The 2013 McNeese State Cowboys football team represented McNeese State University in the 2013 NCAA Division I FCS football season. The Cowboys were led by eighth-year head coach Matt Viator and played their home games at Cowboy Stadium. They were a member of the Southland Conference. They finished the season 10–3, 6–1 in Southland play to finish in second place. They received an at-large bid to the FCS Playoffs where they lost in the second round to Jacksonville State.

Media
All McNeese State games were broadcast on Gator 99.5 FM. KVHP 30.2 is the local affiliate for SLC TV and aired McNeese State games on SLC TV.

Schedule

Game summaries

South Florida

Sources:

McNeese State received $400,000 to play the upper division (FBS) USF Bulls to open the 2013 season for both programs. The Bulls prior record as an FBS team playing against FCS teams was 23–0; USF was a 20.5 point favorite before the game. The Cowboys spoiled Willie Taggart's debut as the Bulls' head coach, winning 53–21. The 32-point margin was the largest margin of victory by any FCS team over an FBS team since Division I was split into FBS and FCS in 1978.

Arkansas-Pine Bluff

Sources:

West Alabama

Sources:

Weber State

Sources:

Northern Iowa

Sources:

Central Arkansas

Sources:

Sam Houston State

Sources:

Nicholls State

Sources:

Southeastern Louisiana

Sources:

Stephen F. Austin

Sources:

Northwestern State

Sources:

Lamar

Sources:

Ranking movements

References

McNeese State
McNeese Cowboys football seasons
McNeese State
McNeese State Cowboys football